Henry Barratt Grosvenor Hill (23 July 1861 – 4 June 1913) was an English cricketer. Hill was a right-handed batsman who bowled slow left-arm orthodox. He was born at Birmingham, Warwickshire.

Hill made his first-class debut in Warwickshire's inaugural first-class match against Nottinghamshire at Trent Bridge in 1894. He made two further first-class appearances in that year against Surrey and Gloucestershire, while the following year he made a single first-class appearance against Yorkshire in the County Championship at Park Avenue, Bradford. Five years later he made a final first-class appearance for Warwickshire against London County. In five first-class matches, Hill scored 41 runs at an average of 6.83, with a high score of 13. With the ball, he took 5 wickets at a bowling average of 49.60, with best figures of 3/15.

He died at the city of his birth on 4 June 1913. His brother John Hill and nephew Alfred Hill both played first-class cricket.

References

External links
Henry Hill at ESPNcricinfo

1861 births
1913 deaths
Cricketers from Birmingham, West Midlands
English cricketers
Warwickshire cricketers
English cricketers of 1890 to 1918